Petopentia, commonly known as propeller vine, is a genus of plant in the family Apocynaceae first described as a genus in 1954. It contains only one known species, Petopentia natalensis, native to the Province of KwaZulu-Natal in eastern South Africa.

This genus should not be confused with the related genus with a similar name, Pentopetia.

References

Periplocoideae
Flora of South Africa
Monotypic Apocynaceae genera